The Pains of Growing is the second studio album by Canadian singer and songwriter Alessia Cara. The album was released on November 30, 2018, by Def Jam Recordings. Its songs were mostly written by Cara herself, with co-writing from producers Pop & Oak. The Pains of Growing is a "coming of age" record, inspired by three years of the singer's life that led up to its release. Primarily, the album touches themes such as anxiety, heartbreak, and loneliness, as of Cara's experiences inside the music industry. Critics named Cara and her sound as "the big-sister of pop", and praised Cara's songwriting ability. The album would eventually win a Juno Award for Album of the Year at the 2020 Juno Awards, and would also receive accolades on other categories that same year.

The album debuted at 71 on the US Billboard 200 and at number 21 in Canada. The Pains of Growing generated three singles. "Growing Pains", released as the album's lead single on June 15, 2018, charted at number 65 on the Billboard Hot 100 and at number 36 in Canada. "Trust My Lonely" and "Out of Love" were respectively released as its second and third singles. Cara promoted the album through a series of public appearances and televised live performances, and later, on May 11, 2019, began embarking on 'The Pains of Growing Tour', in Ottawa, Ontario. In addition to her own tour, Cara opened for Shawn Mendes' tour during his US, Canadian and some European dates.

Background and release
According to Cara, The Pains of Growing explores "the nuance and mentality of what it's like to age out of your teen years", as she was 21 during the writing and recording of it. She added that the album is "a little bit more mature, and a little bit more cohesive. It just feels more like a full album. And then conceptually, I know I already touched on it before, but just life experiences and just a lot more transparency". Steven J. Horowitz of Billboard called the album a "more mature, radio-ready body of work". From December 2018 to January 2019, Cara uploaded videos to her YouTube channel as a part of a series called "The Making Of: The Pains of Growing", in the videos she puts together a collection of behind the scenes for her songs, giving fans a look at how the songs came together in short summaries, she has created videos for the seven songs from her album: "All We Know", "I Don't Want To", "Trust My Lonely", "Wherever I Live", "7 Days", "Not Today" and "Growing Pains".

Promotion

Singles
"Growing Pains", the album's lead single, was released on June 15, 2018, and serviced to hot adult contemporary radio on June 25, 2018. The song peaked at number 36 in Canada, number 65 in the United States, and number 87 in Australia. The second single, "Trust My Lonely", was released on October 5, 2018. "Out of Love" was released to US contemporary hit radio on January 29, 2019, as the album's third single.

Promotional singles 
Two promotional singles preceded the album. "A Little More" was released on July 11, and "Not Today" was released on November 13.

Live performances
Cara first performed "Growing Pains" on The Tonight Show Starring Jimmy Fallon on June 18, 2018. The singer played most of The Pains of Growing for a media gathering at a Los Angeles studio in June 2018.  On July 11, Cara performed "Growing Pains" on The Late Show with Stephen Colbert. "Growing Pains" was also performed at the 2018 iHeartRadio MMVAs. "Trust My Lonely" has been performed live at the 2018 MTV Europe Music Awards and "Out of Love" was performed at The Tonight Show Starring Jimmy Fallon. Cara shared the cover art and track listing on Twitter on October 26.

Critical reception

Upon its release, The Pains of Growing received generally favorable reviews from music critics. On the review aggregator site Metacritic, the album holds a score of 72/100, based on 13 reviews. Rob Sheffield, writing for Rolling Stone, awarded the album 4 out of 5 stars, commending Cara's songwriting and vocals and noting her growth from her previous record; Sheffield ends his review by commenting that "all over The Pains of Growing, she's got a style that's all her own." NME likewise gave the album 4 stars out of five and commended "Girl Next Door" as "the most revealing song" on the album, calling the album "impressive and winningly authentic."

Some critics were more mixed in their assessments of the album. Ben Beaumont-Thomas, writing for The Guardian, criticized "some production that sounds suspiciously like focus-grouping" and also deemed the lyrics a "mixed bag", but commended "7 Days" and "A Little More" as "much more affecting." He gave the album 3 stars out of 5. Pitchfork critic Jayson Greene scored the album 6.8 out of 10; he opined that "a few songs here feel like homework assignments done en route to arrive at a better song." However, he also wrote that, unlike its predecessor, the album "has the tinge of a project made with love and devotion" and singled out "Not Today", "Trust My Lonely", "Nintendo Game", "Wherever I Live", and "Girl Next Door" as highlights. In the review for AllMusic, Andy Kellman compared the album to Cara's previous release, stating that "The Pains of Growing is consequently more fragmented and less consistent than Know-It-All, but Cara makes the best of it, generally writing in a slightly wiser and sharper manner from the same introverted homebody perspective."

Commercial performance
In Canada, The Pains of Growing debuted at number 21 In the United States the album debuted at number 71 on the Billboard 200. Elsewhere, it charted at number 165 on the Belgium Ultratop Flanders chart, number 76 in Australia and number 78 on the Dutch Albums Chart.

Track listing

Track listing adapted from iTunes.

Personnel
Credits for The Pains of Growing adapted from AllMusic.
All lyrics written by Alessia Cara.

Studios

Recording locations

 4220 Studios (Los Angeles)  recording 
 Paramount Recording Studios (Los Angeles)  recording 
 Revolution Recording (Toronto, ON)  recording 

Additional recording locations

 The Bridge Miloco Studios (London)  guitars 

Engineering locations

 SuCasa Recording (Los Angeles)  engineering 
 Cherry Beach Sound (Toronto)  engineering 
 The Synagogue (Los Angeles)  engineering 
 Alessia's Basement Studios (Brampton, ON)  engineering 
 Harbourfront Studios (Toronto)  engineering 
 Elysian Park (Los Angeles)  engineering 
 The Green Building Studio (Santa Monica)  engineering 
 Panoram Studios (Mexico City)  vocals engineering 

Mixing and mastering locations
 
 Larrabee Sound Studios (North Hollywood)  mixing 
 Studio 55 (Los Angeles)  mixing 
 United Recording Studio (Los Angeles)  mixing 
 Miami Mastering Studios  mastering 
 Sterling Sound  mastering

Vocals

 Alessia Cara – primary artist, vocals 
 Pop & Oak – additional vocals 

Instrumentation
 Alessia Cara – instrumentation 
 Pop & Oak – instrumentation , keyboards  
 Downtown Trevor Brown – instrumentation , guitars , drums 
 Zaire Koalo – instrumentation , drum programming 
 Ricky Reed – instrumentation 
 Jon Sosin – guitar 
 Bianca McC – violin 
 Jon Levine – keyboard, bass and drum programming 
 Steve Wyreman – piano, Hammond B3, bass, guitar   
 Nate Mercereau – guitar, french horn, trumpet 
 Stephen Feigenbaum – string arrangement 
 Brandyn Porter – acoustic guitar 
 Rick Nowels – piano, pizzicato strings 
 Brian Griffin – live drums 
 Dean Reid – drum programming, live drums 
 Dylan Brady – bass, percussion, effects 
 Zac Rae – keyboards, strings, bass 
 Patrick Warren – strings 
 Eric Ruscinski – guitar, guitar arrangement 

Production
 Alessia Cara – executive production, production 
 Tony Perez – executive production
 Robert Elazer – executive production
 Pop & Oak – production 
 Jon Levine – production 
 Ricky Reed – production 
 Downtown Trevor Brown – co-production 
 Zaire Koalo – co-production 
 No I.D. – production 
 Steve Wyreman – production 
 ClickNPress – production 
 Rick Nowels – production 
 Nate Mercereau – production  
 Frank Walker – additional production 
 Rain on Shine – additional production 
 Zedd – production 
 Linus Wiklund – production 

Technical
 Oak Felder – programming , engineering
 Pop & Oak – programming 
 Inaam Haq – engineering 
 Downtown Trevor Brown – programming 
 Zaire Koalo – programming 
 Alessia Cara – engineering 
 Ethan Shumaker – engineering 
 Keith Sorrels –   engineering , engineering assistance 
 Kieron Menzies –      engineering 
 Trevor Yasuda –    engineering 
 Chris Rockwell –  engineering 
 Dean Reid – engineering 
 Ryan Reault – recording engineering assistance 
 Casey Cuayo – recording engineering assistance 
 Juan Sebastian Rodriguez – vocals engineering 
 Gabriel Leal – recording engineering assistance 
 Manny Marroquin – mixing 
 Matt Green – mixing  
 George Seara – mixing  
 Jimmy Douglass – mixing 
 Javier Garza – mixing 
 Chris Gehringer - mastering 
 Jim Caruana – recording 
 Matt Anthony – recording 
 Stephen Koszler – recording 
 Simon Todkill – guitar recording 
 Antonio Baglio – mastering 
 Chris Gehringer – mastering
 
Artwork & management
 superduperbrick – cover art & photography
 James McCloud – direction of photography
 Ashley Pawlak – package design
 Andy Proctor – package production
 Tab Nkhereanye – A&R
 Korinne Perez – A&R for EP Entertainment
 Liza Corsey – A&R administration
 Leesa D. Brunson – A&R operations
 Brittany Mansfield – A&R coordination
 Chris Smith – management
 Theo Sedlmayr – legal representation
 Aaron Rosenberg – EP legal representation
 Odell Nails – business affairs
 Ian Allen – business affairs
 Antoinette Trotman – business affairs
 Jamie Sudhalter – business affairs
 Vol S. Davis III – business affairs

Charts

Certifications

Release history

References

External links

2018 albums
Alessia Cara albums
Def Jam Recordings albums
Juno Award for Album of the Year albums
Juno Award for Pop Album of the Year albums
Albums produced by Oak Felder